The Grob G 120TP is a two-seat turboprop training and aerobatic low-wing aircraft with a composite airframe, built by Grob Aircraft. It is based on the Grob G 120A training aircraft and has been developed for military and civil pilots training. It has a retractable tricycle landing gear and a low tailplane.

The first customer was the Indonesian Air Force. EASA Part 23 type certification was completed in May 2013.

Design and development
Designed to be a further development of the G 120A, the G 120TP turned during the development process into a nearly new type of aircraft. Due to the new powertrain, the G 120TP offers new capabilities for basic and advanced pilot training, where it can be used as a lead-in for a jet trainer.

The airframe is made of fiberglass reinforced plastic and is stressed to +6/-4g. The wings are made of carbon fibre composites with winglets.

The cockpit provides room for students and teachers wearing military equipment and helmets. The HOTAS control system is similar to that found in other types of aircraft that students may fly later in their careers. Therefore, basic and advanced flight training for future transport aircraft, helicopter, or jet pilots will be possible. The cockpit is equipped with movable seats, or optionally, the new Martin-Baker Mk.17 lightweight ejection seats. The instrument panel can be equipped with a 4-screen Genesys Aerosystems IDU-680 EFIS. An autopilot and air conditioning system are available, as well as an oxygen system and second thrust lever.

Operators

 

 Argentine Air Force
Argentina is the second operator of the G 120TP. Deliveries of the first batch of four aircraft started in June 2013, with a total delivery of 10 aircraft(+5).

 Bangladesh Air Force
Ordered 24 in June 2021. Under the deal, Grob Aircraft will also  build a fiberglass reinforced plastic and carbon fibre composite repair workshop and a propeller repair workshop in Bangladesh. On 15 December 2021, the Bangladesh Air Force received the first 12 Grob G-120TPs, from Germany. Full delivery will be completed in 2022.
 
 Ecuadorian Air Force
 Ecuadorian Air Force is an operator of the G 120TP. Deliveries of the aircraft started in 2019, with a total of eight aircraft.

 Ethiopian Air Force
The Ethiopian Air Force operates a total of six G 120TP that were all acquired in 2020.

 German Air Force
The German Air Force have chosen four G 120TPs to train its air force pilots at the Phoenix-Goodyear airport, Arizona.

 Indonesian Air Force
The launch customer for the G 120TP was the Indonesian Air Force, which operates a fleet of 30 aircraft, as well as a G 120TP – Flight Training Device.

 Royal Jordanian Air Force
The Royal Jordanian Air Force (RJAF) awarded Grob Aircraft an order to supply 14 aircraft, among which one CBT System and one G 120TP FTD for elementary pilot training. The aircraft entered service in April 2017. Around that same time, Grob confirmed it had delivered 12 of the 14 ordered aircraft. In January 2018, the Bundeswehr announced it had donated two aircraft to Jordan.

 Kenya Air Force
The Kenya Air Force operates a fleet of nine G 120TP training aircraft.

 Mexican Air Force
The Mexican Air Force (FAM) has selected the Grob  G 120TP as its new elementary trainer. The contract contains 25 aircraft (+15) equipped with the Genesys Aerosytems EFIS IDU-680. The delivery of the first batch was in February 2015 and the final batch in February 2016. The training will be completed by a Computer Based Training (CBT) System and four G 120TP Flight Training Devices.

 Myanmar Air Force
The Myanmar Air Force operates a fleet of 20 G 120TP (+10) training aircraft equipped with Genesys Aerosystems EFIS IDU-680. The pilot training will be supported by a CBT System and one G 120TP FTD.

 Swedish Air Force
In 2021, the Swedish Air Force selected the Grob G 120 TP as its new Basic Trainer Aircraft, designated SK 40 (Trainer Aircraft type 40). Ten aircraft and a simulator are on order, with delivery expected in 2022 and service starting in 2023.

 UK Military Flying Training System
The MFTS provides tri-service Elementary Flying Training to British military pilots on a fleet of 23 G 120TPs named the Grob Prefect T1.
The system replaces separate flying fixed-wing and rotary training programs for the Royal Air Force, Royal Navy and Army Air Corps. The service provider Ascent uses the G 120TP together with the Beechcraft T-6 to provide initial, basic and advanced training.

United States Army

Specifications

See also

References

External links

 

G120TP
2010s German military trainer aircraft
Single-engined tractor aircraft
Low-wing aircraft
Single-engined turboprop aircraft
Aircraft first flown in 2010